Ferris Jacobs Jr. (March 20, 1836 – August 30, 1886) was an American officer and politician; he was a United States representative from New York.

Biography
Jacobs was born in Delhi, Delaware County, New York, and attended Delaware Academy and  Delaware Literary Institute. He graduated from  Williams College in 1856; studied law and was admitted to the bar in 1859 and commenced practice in Delhi. During the American Civil War he served in the Union Army as a commissioned captain in the 3rd New York Cavalry as lieutenant colonel of the 26th New York Cavalry. He also served as brevetted brigadier general of Volunteers. Later he resumed law practice in Delhi, New York and was elected district attorney in 1865 and 1866. He delegated at the Republican National Convention in 1880, and was elected as a Republican in the Forty-seventh Congress (March 4, 1881 – March 3, 1883). He was not a candidate for renomination in 1882, so resumed the practice of law. He died in White Plains, New York, interment in Woodland Cemetery, Delhi, New York.

References
 Retrieved on 2008-02-14

1836 births
1886 deaths
Williams College alumni
Union Army colonels
Republican Party members of the United States House of Representatives from New York (state)
19th-century American politicians